Datun may also refer to:

 The datun, the Indian name for teeth-cleaning twigs.
 The Datun Volcanoes, mountains in Taiwan
 Datun Sahib, a tree in Ladakh

See also 
 Datsun, a car brand by Nissan